Marquez Antonio Callaway (born March 27, 1998) is an American football wide receiver for the New Orleans Saints of the National Football League (NFL). He played college football at Tennessee.

High school career
Callaway attended and played high school football at Warner Robins High School in Warner Robins, Georgia. A 4-star recruit, Callaway committed to Tennessee to play college football over offers from Alabama, Florida, Georgia, Michigan State, and Notre Dame, among others.

College career
Callaway played at the University of Tennessee from 2016–2019 under head coaches Butch Jones and Jeremy Pruitt. Callaway had 92 receptions for 1,646 yards and 13 receiving touchdowns in his four seasons at Tennessee.

College statistics

Professional career

In April 2020, Callaway signed with the New Orleans Saints as an undrafted free agent after the 2020 NFL Draft. He made his NFL debut in Week 2 against the Las Vegas Raiders playing on offense and special teams. In Week 4 against the Detroit Lions, he had his first professional reception on a 16-yard catch in the 35–29 victory. In a Week 5 matchup against the Los Angeles Chargers, Callaway was targeted six times and made four  receptions for 34 yards.

On October 25, 2020, in a game against the Carolina Panthers, Callaway caught Drew Brees’ 7,000th completion. He finished the game with eight receptions for 75 yards, both team highs. He was placed on injured reserve on December 5, 2020. He was activated on December 24. As a rookie, he appeared in 11 games, of which he started three. He finished his rookie season with 21 receptions for 213 receiving yards.

Callaway's role expanded in the 2021 season. He scored his first professional receiving touchdown on a seven-yard reception from Jameis Winston in the 28–13 victory over the New England Patriots in Week 3. In Week 5, against the Washington Football Team, he had his first multi-touchdown game in the 33–22 victory. In Week 15, against the Tampa Bay Buccaneers, he had six receptions for 112 receiving yards in the 9–0 victory. On the 2021 season, Callaway appeared in all 17 games. He finished with 46 receptions for 698 receiving yards and six receiving touchdowns.

In the 2022 season, Callaway appeared in 14 games. He finished with 16 receptions for 158 receiving yards and one receiving touchdown.

NFL career statistics

References

External links

 Tennessee Volunteers bio
 New Orleans Saints bio

Living people
African-American players of American football
American football wide receivers
New Orleans Saints players
People from Warner Robins, Georgia
Players of American football from Georgia (U.S. state)
Tennessee Volunteers football players
1998 births
21st-century African-American sportspeople